Joseph Frank Rupert (June 24, 1912 – February 5, 1996) was an American college football, basketball, and track and field athlete and coach at the University of Kentucky. He was a Navy veteran of World War II, and after his sporting career was a chairman of the board of the Rupert-Hager-Cromwell-Agency in Ashland.

University of Kentucky

Playing career
Prior to his career at the University of Kentucky, Rupert attended high school in Catlettsburg. He stood 6 feet 1 inches and weighed 180 pounds.

Football
Rupert was a prominent end on the football team, selected All-Southern in 1932 by the coaches of the Alabama Crimson Tide.

Coaching career
Rupert was head track coach and the assistant football and basketball coach for his from 1938 to 1941.

References

1912 births
1996 deaths
American football ends
American men's basketball players
Centers (basketball)
Kentucky Wildcats football coaches
Kentucky Wildcats football players
Kentucky Wildcats men's basketball coaches
Kentucky Wildcats men's basketball players
Kentucky Wildcats men's track and field athletes
Kentucky Wildcats track and field coaches
All-Southern college football players
People from Catlettsburg, Kentucky
Coaches of American football from Kentucky
Players of American football from Kentucky
Basketball coaches from Kentucky
Basketball players from Kentucky
Track and field athletes from Kentucky